Brahim Lahlafi (born 15 April 1968, in Fes) is a retired long-distance runner who represented Morocco during his active career. He acquired French citizenship on 6 April 2002, but represented Morocco again from 15 March 2007.

His greatest achievement was the Olympic bronze medal in 2000. This was his first medal at a major international event, having barely missed the podium at the 1995 World Cross Country Championships (5th place) and twice in 5000 metres at the World Championships; 1995 (5th) and 1999 (fourth). He did win a bronze medal in 3000 metres at the 1998 African Championships.

In 1996 he was the winner of the inaugural Belgrade Race Through History competition. He beat Paul Tergat to the finish line of the 6 km race and remains the course record holder of the competition.

Personal bests
1500 metres - 3:43.2 (1996)
3000 metres - 7:28.94 (1999)
5000 metres - 12:49.28 (2000)
10000 metres - 27:43.05 (1995)
Half marathon - 1:01:39 (1994)

References

External links

1968 births
Living people
People from Fez, Morocco
Moroccan male long-distance runners
French male long-distance runners
Olympic athletes of Morocco
Olympic bronze medalists for Morocco
Athletes (track and field) at the 1996 Summer Olympics
Athletes (track and field) at the 2000 Summer Olympics
World Athletics Championships athletes for Morocco
French sportspeople of Moroccan descent
Medalists at the 2000 Summer Olympics
Olympic bronze medalists in athletics (track and field)
20th-century Moroccan people
21st-century Moroccan people